The Dry Creek Joint Elementary School District began in 1876, with only a few students in a schoolhouse. It is now among the fastest growing school districts in the State of California. The District has constructed new elementary schools in the past four years. Creekview Ranch Middle School was the most recent school to open in the district, first serving students for the 2008–2009 school year. It is anticipated that the District will continue to grow for the next 10 years, serving approximately 8,500 K-8 students.

In 2003 Center Unified School District gave territory to Roseville Joint Union High School District and Dry Creek Joint Elementary School District.

Schools 

 Antelope Crossing Middle School
 Antelope Meadows Elementary School
 Barrett Ranch Elementary School
 Connections Academy
 Coyote Ridge Elementary School
 Creekview Ranch TK-8 School
 Heritage Oak Elementary School
 Olive Grove Elementary School 
 Quail Glen Elementary School
 Silverado Middle School

References

External links 
 Dry Creek Joint Elementary School District

School districts in Placer County, California
School districts in Sacramento County, California
School districts established in 1876
Roseville, California
1876 establishments in California